Zhu Wenkui (born November 30, 1396) was the elder son and Crown Prince of the Jianwen Emperor of the Ming dynasty, born by Empress Ma.

In 1402, Zhu Di, Prince of Yan sacked Nanjing, both Jianwen and Wenkui disappeared. It was said that Wenkui died in the palace fire.

In the period of the Southern Ming, he was posthumously honored Crown Prince Gongmin (by the Hongguang Emperor) and Crown Prince Hejian (by the Longwu Emperor).

See also
List of people who disappeared

References

1396 births
Disappeared princes
Heirs apparent who never acceded
Missing person cases in China
Sons of emperors
Year of death unknown